was a food supply ship of the Imperial Japanese Navy which was in service from the 1920s to the Second World War.

Construction
Mamiya was originally meant to be an oil transporter but was instead outfitted to be a food supply ship. The Imperial Japanese Navy sent her to the Kawasaki Shipbuilding Yard where she was fitted with facilities for carrying enough food for 18,000 men over three weeks, and kitchens to produce large quantities of food including yōkan, manjū, tofu, and konyaku. A number of chefs and pastry chefs were employed aboard and she became part of the Combined Fleet.

Service in Pacific War
Already old by the outbreak of war, she continued to be part of the navy's operations in the Pacific. In both cases she was repaired and returned to service. She was torpedoed again and sunk on 21 December by Sealion.

Books
The Maru Special, Japanese Naval Vessels No.34 Japanese Auxiliary ships, Ushio Shobō (Japan), December 1979, Book code 68343-34
Collection of writings by Sizuo Fukui Vol.10, Stories of Japanese Support Vessels, Kōjinsha (Japan), December 1993,

External links
 Mamiya in combinedfleet.com

World War II naval ships of Japan
Ships sunk by American submarines
1923 ships
Maritime incidents in December 1944
Ships built by Kawasaki Heavy Industries